The Serb Party of Socialists was the branch in Croatia of Serbian President Slobodan Milošević's Socialist Party of Serbia which was created in the areas under the control of rebel Serbs of Croatia (so-called Republic of Serbian Krajina). In 1993, Milan Martić ran for President of Serbian Krajina and received heavy financial support from the Milošević government. In a second round of voting in 1994 he was elected President and remained in power until the fall of Serbian Krajina during the Croatian Operation Storm in 1995.

References

Democratic socialist parties in Europe
Serb political parties in Croatia
Socialist Party of Serbia
Republic of Serbian Krajina
Defunct political parties in Croatia
Socialist parties in Croatia
History of the Serbs of Croatia
Political parties established in 1991
Political parties disestablished in 1995
1991 establishments in Croatia
1995 disestablishments in Croatia